The Jalisco Open (currently known as Zurich Jalisco Open presentado por Aeromexico y Lacoste for sponsorship reasons) is a tennis tournament held in Zapopan, Guadalajara Metropolitan Area, Mexico since 2011. The event is part of the ATP Challenger Tour and is played on outdoor hard court at the Centro Panamericano de Tenis.

Past finals

Singles

Doubles

References

External links

 
ATP Challenger Tour
Tennis tournaments in Mexico
Hard court tennis tournaments